"Drill Instructor" is a song recorded by the German eurodance group Captain Jack, consisting of rapper Franky Gee and singer Liza da Costa. It was released in March 1996 as the second single from their album, The Mission. The song was the follow-up to their 1995 hit "Captain Jack" and had a great success in many countries, particularly in the Netherlands, where it topped the chart. The song also reached the top 10 in Austria, Belgium, Czech Republic, Finland and Germany. On the Eurochart Hot 100, "Drill Instructor" peaked at number 14 in May 1996.

Music video
The music video was directed by Mark Glaeser and filmed in California.

Charts

Weekly charts

Year-end charts

Certifications

References

1996 songs
1996 singles
Captain Jack (band) songs
Dutch Top 40 number-one singles
Music videos directed by Mark Glaeser